John Henry McCarthy (November 16, 1850 – February 5, 1908) was an American lawyer, jurist, and politician who served one term as a U.S. Representative from New York from 1889 to 1891.

Biography 
Born in New York City, McCarthy attended De La Salle Institute, Christian Brothers, and St. Francis Xavier College.
He engaged in mercantile pursuits.
He studied law.
He was admitted to the bar in 1873 and commenced practice in New York City.

Political career 
He served as member of the State assembly in 1880 and 1881.
Civil justice for the fifth judicial district in the city of New York 1882–1888.

Congress 
McCarthy was elected as a Democrat to the Fifty-first Congress and served from March 4, 1889, until his resignation on January 14, 1891, to accept a judicial position.

Later career and death 
He was appointed on January 11, 1891, by Gov. David B. Hill justice of the city court of New York City to fill a vacancy.

McCarthy was elected and reelected to the same office and served from 1891 until his death in New York City on February 5, 1908.

He was interred in Calvary Cemetery, Long Island City, New York.

Sources

1850 births
1908 deaths
American Roman Catholics
Burials at Calvary Cemetery (Queens)
Democratic Party members of the United States House of Representatives from New York (state)
Democratic Party members of the New York State Assembly
19th-century American politicians